is a motorsport race track standing in the foothills of Mount Fuji, in Oyama, Suntō District, Shizuoka Prefecture, Japan. It was built in the early 1960s. In the 1980s, Fuji Speedway was used for the FIA World Sportscar Championship and national racing. Originally managed by Mitsubishi Estate Co., Fuji Speedway was acquired by Toyota Motor Corporation in 2000.  The circuit hosted the Formula One Japanese Grand Prix in 2007 after an absence of nearly 30 years, replacing the Suzuka Circuit owned by Honda. After Fuji Speedway hosted the 2008 race, the Japanese Grand Prix returned to Suzuka for races from 2009 onward. The Super GT Fuji 500 km race is held at the racetrack on Golden Week.

The circuit has an FIA Grade 1 license.

History

1963–79: F1 launches in Japan 
Fuji Speedway Corporation was established in 1963 as Japan NASCAR Corporation. At first, the circuit was planned to hold NASCAR-style races in Japan. Therefore, the track was originally designed to be a  banked superspeedway, but there was not enough money to complete the project and only one of the bankings was completed. Mitsubishi Estate Co. invested in the circuit and took over the reins of management in October 1965.

Converted to a road course, the circuit opened in December 1965 and proved to be somewhat dangerous, with the wide banked turn (named "Daiichi") regularly resulting in major accidents. Vic Elford said:

After a fatal accident in 1974 on the Daiichi banking where drivers Hiroshi Kazato and Seiichi Suzuki were both killed in a fiery accident that injured 6 other people, a new part of track was built to counteract the problem, and the resultant  course, which also eliminated 5 other fast corners, proved more successful. In 1966, the track hosted a USAC Indy Car non-championship race, won by Jackie Stewart. The track had a 24-hour race in 1967.

The speedway brought the first Formula One race to Japan at the end of the 1976 season. The race had a dramatic World Championship battle between James Hunt and Niki Lauda, and in rainy conditions, Hunt earned enough points to win the title. Mario Andretti won the race, with Lauda withdrawing due to the dangerous conditions.

In 1977, Gilles Villeneuve was involved in a crash that killed two spectators on the side of the track, leading to Formula One leaving the speedway. When Japan earned another race on the F1 schedule ten years later, it went to Suzuka instead. The Grand Prix returned to Fuji in 2007 following its renovation.

1980–2000: National racing venue

Fuji remained a popular sports car racing venue; the FIA World Sportscar Championship visited the track between 1982 and 1988 and it was often used for national races. Speeds continued to be very high, and two chicanes were added to the track: one after the first hairpin corner, the second at the entry to the wide, fast final turn (300R).

The long pit straight has also been utilised for drag racing. NHRA exhibitions were run in 1989, and in 1993 Shirley Muldowney ran a 5.30 on the quarter-mile strip at Fuji. Local drag races are common on the circuit, at both  &  distances.

The track continued to be used for Japanese national races. Plans to host a CART event in 1991 were abandoned due to conflicts with the Fédération Internationale du Sport Automobile. It was not until the autumn of 2000 that the majority of the stocks of the track were bought by Toyota from Mitsubishi Estate as part of its motor racing plans for the future.

On May 3, 1998, there was a multi-car crash during a parade lap before a JGTC race caused by the safety car slowing in torrential rain. Ferrari driver Tetsuya Ota suffered serious burns over his entire body after being trapped in his car for almost 90 seconds, and Porsche driver Tomohiko Sunako fractured his right leg.

2001–present: renovations
In 2003, the circuit was closed down to accommodate a major reprofiling of the track, using a new design from Hermann Tilke. The track was reopened on April 10, 2005, and hosted its first Formula One championship event in 29 years on September 30, 2007. In circumstances similar to Fuji's first Grand Prix in 1976, the race was run in heavy rain and mist and the first 19 laps were run under the safety car, in a race won by Lewis Hamilton.

The circuit has hosted the Nismo Festival for historic Nissan racers since refurbishment in 2003; the event previously took place at Okayama.  When the festival returned in 2005, the organisers allowed circuit owner Toyota to bring in their Toyota 7 CanAm racer to re-enact an old Japanese GP battle. Toyota also hosts its own historic event a week before the NISMO festival called the Toyota Motorsports Festival. Close to the circuit is a drifting course, which was built as part of the refurbishment under the supervision of "Drift King" Keiichi Tsuchiya and former works driver and Super GT team manager Masanori Sekiya. There is a Toyota Safety Education Center and a mini circuit. In addition to motorsports, Fuji also hosts the Udo Music Festival.

The only time the circuit is run on a reverse direction is during the D1 Grand Prix round, as Keiichi Tsuchiya felt the new layout meant reduced entry speed, making it less suitable for drifting. The series has hosted its rounds since ; with the exception of the 2004 closure, the circuit became the first to take place on an international level racetrack and the first of the three to take place on an F1 circuit. The drift course starts from the 300R section and ends past the Coca-Cola corner.  With the reprofiling, as cars no longer run downbank, entry speeds have since been reduced, the hill at the exit making acceleration difficult. As part of the 2003 renovations, most of the old banked section of track was demolished. Only a small section remains to this day.

Fuji Speedway was announced to host the finish of the road cycling races at the 2020 Summer Olympics and 2020 Summer Paralympics.

2007 and 2008 Japanese Grands Prix

During the 2007 Japanese Grand Prix, Fuji Speedway met with a lot of problems, including the paralysis of the transportation network provided by the shuttle buses, poor facilities including some reserved seats without a view, lack of organization, and expensive meals such as simple lunch boxes being sold for 10,000 yen (US$87) at the circuit.

Newspaper accounts of the event also alleged problems with Toyota bias and control. The circuit prohibited spectators from setting up flags and banners to support teams and drivers, with the exception of the Toyota F1 team. Therefore, there were very few flags and banners in the event compared with other Grand Prix events.

For the 2008 Japanese Grand Prix race, organizers responded to lessons learned the previous year by reducing the total number of spectators allowed at the event.  Compared to 140,000 persons allowed for Sunday events in 2007, attendance was restricted to 110,000. Additionally, walkways and spectator facilities were improved, along with larger screens. However, the race was also affected by rainy weather, which has historically interfered in a number of past races at the circuit, and later in 2013, led to interference with a 6-hour endurance race at the track for the FIA World Endurance Championship.

Following both poor ticket sales and weather, it was decided by FOM that the FIA Japanese Grand Prix would be shared between Fuji and Suzuka on alternate years, with Suzuka holding the next race on Sunday, October 4, 2009. After the global recession and its own operational deficit, Toyota decided to discontinue the hosting of Japanese Grand Prix since 2010.

2020 Summer Olympics
During the 2020 Summer Olympics, which due to the COVID-19 pandemic were postponed to 2021, the speedway was a venue and finish for the cycling races:
 Men's individual road race: on 24 July 2021  won the gold medal,  silver and  bronze.
 Women's individual road race: on 25 July 2021  won the gold medal,  silver and  bronze.
 Women's road time trial: on 28 July 2021  won the gold medal,  won silver and  won bronze.
 Men's road time trial: on 28 July 2021  won the gold medal,  silver and  bronze.

2022: Fuji Motorsports Forest 
The project precedes the completion of the Shin-Tōmei Expressway and smart interchange near the circuit.

With the regional redevelopment plan centered on Fuji Speedway, the Fuji Speedway Hotel (operated by Hyatt) including  the Fuji Motorsports Museum was built on the west side of the circuit and opened in October 2022.

Events

 Current

 April: Super Formula Championship, Formula Regional Japanese Championship Fuji Champion Race Series, TCR Japan Touring Car Series, Ferrari Challenge Japan
 May: Super GT Fuji 500 km Race, F4 Japanese Championship, Super Taikyu
 June: GT World Challenge Asia Fanatec Japan Cup, GT4 Asia Series
 July: Super Formula Championship, Super Formula Lights, Lamborghini Super Trofeo Asia, Ferrari Challenge Japan Ferrari Racing Days
 August: Super GT, F4 Japanese Championship, Porsche Carrera Cup Japan
 September: FIA World Endurance Championship 6 Hours of Fuji, Formula Regional Japanese Championship
 October: TCR Japan Touring Car Series
 November: Super Taikyu

 Former

 2020 Summer Olympics Cycling (2021)
 Asian Le Mans Series (2013–2018)
 Formula One Japanese Grand Prix (1976–1977, 2007–2008)
 Grand Prix motorcycle racing Japanese motorcycle Grand Prix (1966–1967)
 Japan Le Mans Challenge (2007)
 World Sportscar Championship All Japan Fuji 1000 Kilometres (1982–1988)
 World Touring Car Championship Fuji InterTEC 500 (1987)

Layout history

Race Lap Records

As of March 2023, the fastest official race lap records at the Fuji Speedway are listed as:

Corners
This is the official listing of the twelve corners that make up the current circuit layout, in use since 2005. Only some corners have Japanese names, most of which are a result of sponsorship agreements. The rest are named after the radius of the corner in metres.

TGR Corner (27R)
75R
Coca-Cola Corner (80R)
Toyopet (100R)
Advan Corner (30R)
120R
300R
Dunlop Corner (15R)
30R
45R
GR Supra Corner (25R)
Panasonic Corner (12R)

The Dunlop corner differs with the configuration used. In the full configuration, it consists of a tight right hairpin turn followed by a left-right flick. In the GT course, it is a medium-speed right-hander, bypassing turns 11 and 12.

Fuji Speedway in videogames
The Fuji circuit is represented in the arcade racing game Pole Position, and is one of the four selectable tracks in Pole Position II. Fuji is also featured in Project CARS 2, Top Gear, TOCA Race Driver, Gran Turismo 4: Prologue, Gran Turismo 4, Tourist Trophy, Gran Turismo 5: Prologue, Gran Turismo (PSP), Gran Turismo 5, Gran Turismo 6,Gran Turismo Sport and Gran Turismo 7. For F1 Challenge '99–'02, Grand Prix Legends, rFactor, GTR 2 – FIA GT Racing Game, GT Legends, Assoluto Racing, Race 07, the track is available as free downloadable content. The track is also available in Grid Legends as paid downloadable content.

Fuji Speedway in television
The Fuji circuit is featured prominently in the Japanese television drama Engine as the main setting for the racing scenes, as well as the home of the (fictional) "Regulus Cup".

The track was also featured in an episode of the 11th season of the British automotive show Top Gear, in which host Jeremy Clarkson drives a Nissan GT-R.

Part of the Gaki no Tsukai 2013 New Year's Holiday No-Laughing Earth Defense Force punishment game was also shot at Fuji Speedway.

The circuit was featured in the opening scene of tokusatsu series Dennou Keisatsu Cybercop.

Notes

External links

Fuji Speedway official website
Fuji Speedway info from official F1 website
Map and circuit history at RacingCircuits.info 
Google Map

Motorsport venues in Japan
Formula One circuits
Grand Prix motorcycle circuits
Japanese Grand Prix
Mount Fuji
Sports venues in Shizuoka Prefecture
World Touring Car Championship circuits
Venues of the 2020 Summer Olympics
Olympic cycling venues
Oyama, Shizuoka
Sports venues completed in 1965
1965 establishments in Japan